Canton Junction station is an MBTA Commuter Rail station in Canton, Massachusetts. It serves the Providence/Stoughton Line, and is planned for future service on the South Coast Rail line. It is located slightly north of the Canton Viaduct and west of downtown Canton.

At Canton Junction, the Stoughton Branch of the Providence/Stoughton Line splits from the Northeast Corridor and runs southeast to Stoughton, Massachusetts. The Providence section of the line follows the Northeast Corridor south to Providence, Rhode Island and beyond.

History

Canton Junction opened with the Boston and Providence Railroad in 1835; the Stoughton Branch Railroad opened in early 1845. The current station building was designed by Bradford Lee Gilbert in the Richardsonian Romanesque style and built by the Old Colony Railroad in 1892. It became part of the New York, New Haven and Hartford Railroad a year later in 1893.

From 1989 to 1994, Boston– trains for events at Foxboro Stadium operated over the Northeast Corridor, with intermediate stops including Canton Junction. Boston–Foxboro service was rerouted over the Franklin Line in 1995.

The massive footbridge, built around 2000, showed significant rust and damage to concrete by 2015. Keolis (the commuter rail contract operator) begin major repairs on the footbridge in 2016; however, the company failed to obtain the proper building permits. Construction was suspended in March 2017 with the western ramp and stairs still closed; passengers had to detour on foot over the Spaulding Street bridge to access the Providence-bound platform and the Jackson Street parking lot. Construction resumed in July 2017 and was completed in August.

References

Further reading

External links

MBTA - Canton Junction
 Station from Google Maps Street View

Stations on the Northeast Corridor
MBTA Commuter Rail stations in Norfolk County, Massachusetts
Rail junctions in the United States
Former New York, New Haven and Hartford Railroad stations
Railway stations in the United States opened in 1835
1835 establishments in Massachusetts